is a retired Japanese pole vaulter.

She won the bronze medal at the 2005 East Asian Games,  finished fifth at the 2005 Asian Championships, won the gold medal at the 2006 Asian Indoor Championships, the bronze medal at the 2006 Asian Games and the gold medal at the 2008 Asian Indoor Championships.

Her personal best jump is 4.36 metres, achieved in April 2006 in Hiroshima. Indoors she has 4.31 metres, achieved in February 2006 in Yokohama. These are both former national records.

International competition

References

External links

Ikuko Nishikori at JAAF 

1980 births
Living people
Sportspeople from Shimane Prefecture
Japanese female pole vaulters
Asian Games bronze medalists for Japan
Athletes (track and field) at the 2006 Asian Games
Asian Games medalists in athletics (track and field)
Medalists at the 2006 Asian Games